Radka Brožková (born 21 June 1984 in Rovensko pod Troskami) is a Czech orienteering competitor, bronze medallist from the world championships.

She received a silver medal in middle distance and finished 4th in the relay at the Junior World Orienteering Championships in Gdynia in 2004.

She received a bronze medal in the middle distance at the 2008 World Orienteering Championships in Olomouc, behind Minna Kauppi and Vroni König-Salmi.

See also
 Czech orienteers
 List of orienteers
 List of orienteering events

References

External links

1984 births
Living people
Czech orienteers
Female orienteers
Foot orienteers
World Orienteering Championships medalists
Competitors at the 2009 World Games
People from Semily District
Sportspeople from the Liberec Region
Junior World Orienteering Championships medalists